Carlos Jesús Pérez (born September 10, 1996) is a Venezuelan professional baseball catcher for the Chicago White Sox of Major League Baseball (MLB).

Career
Pérez signed with the Chicago White Sox as an international free agent in March 2014. He made his professional debut that season with the Dominican Summer League White Sox and also played with the team in 2015. Pérez spent 2016 with the Arizona League White Sox, Great Falls Voyagers and Kannapolis Intimidators. He played 2017 with Great Falls, 2018 with Kannapolis and 2019 with the Winston-Salem Dash.

Pérez did not play in 2020, due to there being no Minor League Baseball season because of the Covid-19 pandemic. He returned in 2021 to play for the Birmingham Barons and Charlotte Knights. He returned to Charlotte to start 2022. Pérez was added to the White Soz active roster on August 21 after Yasmani Grandal was placed on the 10-day injured list.

Pérez was optioned to Triple-A Charlotte to begin the 2023 season after losing the backup catcher job to Seby Zavala.

References

External links

1996 births
Living people
Sportspeople from Valencia, Venezuela
Major League Baseball players from Venezuela
Major League Baseball catchers
Chicago White Sox players
Dominican Summer League White Sox players
Arizona League White Sox players
Great Falls Voyagers players
Bravos de Margarita players
Kannapolis Intimidators players
Winston-Salem Dash players
Birmingham Barons players
Charlotte Knights players
Venezuelan expatriate baseball players in the Dominican Republic
Venezuelan expatriate baseball players in the United States